The Waiotahe River (formerly Waiotahi River) is a river of the Bay of Plenty Region of New Zealand's North Island.

On 27 August 2015 the historical name error "Waiotahi" was corrected to the original Māori name "Waiotahe".

See also
List of rivers of New Zealand

References

Rivers of the Bay of Plenty Region
Rivers of New Zealand